"Unspeakable" is a single from Ace of Base's 2002 album Da Capo.

Chart performance
The single peaked at number 3 in Israel, 14 in Finland, 45 in Sweden and 97 in Germany.

Music video
A music video was produced to promote the single. The video was directed by Daniel Borjesson. This was the last Ace of Base video to receive participation from Malin.

Tracklistings
Scandinavia/Germany

CD single
 "Unspeakable" (Album Version)
 "Unspeakable" (Junk & Function / M12 Radio Mix)

CD maxi
 "Unspeakable" (Album Version)
 "Unspeakable" (Junk & Function / M12 Radio Mix)
 "Unspeakable" (Fairlite Radio Mix)
 "Unspeakable" (Filur Radio Mix)
 "Don't Stop" (Unreleased Track)

Official versions/remixes
Album Version
Fairlite Radio Mix
Fairlite Dub Mix
Fairlite Instrumental
Filur Radio Mix
Filur Club Remix
Filur Dub Remix
Junk&Function/M12 Club Mix
Junk&Function/M12 Radio Mix

Release history

Charts

Ace of Base songs
2002 singles
2002 songs
Songs written by Jonas Berggren
Songs written by Niklas von der Burg
Songs written by Adam Anders
Mega Records singles